CSI: Crime Scene Investigation is an American crime drama television series created by Anthony E. Zuiker and executive produced by Jerry Bruckheimer, Carol Mendelsohn, Ann Donahue, William Petersen, Cynthia Chavtel, Naren Shanker, and Don McGill, among others. It follows Las Vegas criminalists (identified as "Crime Scene Investigators") working for the Las Vegas Police Department as they use physical evidence to solve murders. Gil Grissom, a forensic entomologist, D.B. Russell, an esteemed botanist, and Julie Finlay and Catherine Willows, blood spatter experts with extensive knowledge of criminal psychology, head a team who are on the case 24/7, scouring the scene, collecting the evidence, and finding the missing pieces that will solve the mystery. Grissom and Willows were based upon real LVMPD Crime Scene Analysts David Holstein and Yolanda McClary.

Main cast 
CSI originally starred William Petersen and Marg Helgenberger alongside an ensemble including George Eads, Gary Dourdan, and Paul Guilfoyle. Jorja Fox joined the cast in episode two of the first season, whilst Eric Szmanda and Robert David Hall recurred throughout the first two seasons of the show before being promoted to regular status starting with the third. Louise Lombard, who first appeared in season five, joined the cast starting with season seven. The first major cast overhaul came with the show's eighth and ninth seasons. Lombard departed the cast in the first episode of season eight, whilst Fox departed in episode seven of the same season. Wallace Langham joined the main cast following Lombard's departure, having recurred since the third season. Fox would return for guest appearances during the ninth season in order to facilitate the departures of both Gary Dourdan and William Petersen, who were replaced by Lauren Lee Smith and Laurence Fishburne, respectively. Smith departed the cast at the end of her first year, and was replaced by a returning Jorja Fox, who featured in a recurring capacity. Liz Vassey and David Berman, who had recurred from season six, and season one, respectively, also joined the cast starting with season ten. Like Smith, Vassey departed the cast after a single season, and was replaced by Fox, who rejoined the main cast. William Petersen would appear in voice clips sporadically over the next three seasons. Fishburne departed the main cast at the end of season eleven, a season that featured guest appearances by Elisabeth Harnois and Louise Lombard, and was replaced by Ted Danson. Danson made his main cast debut alongside Elisabeth Harnois at the start of the twelfth season. Series lead Marg Helgenberger departed the main cast in the twelfth episode of season twelve and was replaced by Elisabeth Shue. Season thirteen saw Jon Wellner join the main cast after eight years a guest star. Helgenberger returned for a single episode in season fourteen, while Paul Guilfoyle departed at the end of the same year, followed by Elisabeth Shue and George Eads at the end of the fifteenth season. The show's finale, a two-hour film, featured the return of Helgenberger, Petersen, and Guilfoyle. The series finale marked their final appearances, as well as the final appearances of Fox, Szmanda, Hall, Langham, Berman, Harnois, and Wellner. Ted Danson went on to reprise his role of Russell during season two of Cyber.

Crossover characters 
Several main characters from other series have appeared over the course of CSIs sixteen-season run. 

 CSI: Miami stars David Caruso (Horatio Caine), Emily Procter (Calleigh Duquesne), Adam Rodriguez (Eric Delko), Rory Cochrane (Tim Speedle), and Khandi Alexander (Alexx Woods) appear in season 2, episode 23: Cross Jurisdictions. 
 CSI: NY star Gary Sinise (Mac Taylor) appears in season 13, episode 13: In Vino Veritas.
 CSI: Cyber star Patricia Arquette (Avery Ryan) appears in both season 14, episode 21: Kitty, and season 15, episode 6: The Twin Paradox. 
 CSI: Cyber star Ted Danson (D.B. Russell) first appeared in the lead role on CSI, starring from season 12, episode 1: 73 Seconds through Immortality. 
 Without a Trace star Anthony LaPaglia (Jack Malone) appeared in season 8, episode 6: Who and What...?
 Level 26 character Black Sqweegel appears in season 11, episode 4: Sqweegel. He is played by Daniel Browning Smith.

Police officers 
Due to the content of the series, a number of police officers are required to support the principal cast. Detectives, such as Frankie Reed and Sam Vega, are often seen arresting and interviewing suspects alongside the criminalists. Sheriffs and Undersheriffs act as an administrative and supervisory arm of the LVPD and often appear adversarial to the CSIs. Officers are most often seen entering and searching properties, although sometimes they are also seen involved in car chases or other forms of high speed pursuit.

Relatives and friends 
CSI focuses on the characters personal lives as well as their professional, therefore friends and relatives are seen often. Characters such as D.B. Russell, who have a stable home life, require large supporting families, while social introvert Gil Grissom's sole recurring social partner is Lady Heather, a dominatrix. This list is not definitive, and characters who have appeared only once are not listed.

Criminalists 
In addition to the CSIs and technicians of the main cast, several recurring actors appear in these roles. Characters such as Michael Keppler and Ronnie Lake appear for only a short period of time, for specific storylines, while other characters like Mandy Webster and Archie Johnson appear consistently in order to provide a specialty that is absent from the lead characters' résumés. As the series progresses, the number of supporting characters drops dramatically.

Adversaries 
Throughout the series, the CSIs have been forced to confront several recurring adversaries. These characters are usually serial killers, and their motives and M.O. vary greatly.

See also
 Minor characters in CSI: Crime Scene Investigation

Footnotes

 
Lists of CSI (franchise) characters